Jean-Claude Vuithier can refer to:

 Jean-Claude Vuithier Sr. (born 1951), Swiss Olympic sailor
 Jean-Claude Vuithier Jr. (born 1968), Swiss Olympic sailor